Gustavia monocaulis is a species of woody plant in the family Lecythidaceae. It is found in Colombia and Panama. It is threatened by habitat loss.

References

monocaulis
Flora of Colombia
Flora of Panama
Endangered plants
Taxonomy articles created by Polbot